The Goodyear chimney was an iconic landmark on the Goodyear factory on Stafford Road, Wolverhampton, England.

Work started on building the chimney in October 1927, with the mayor of Wolverhampton laying the first brick. In 2008 the factory and chimney were demolished. An Oxely primary school pupil and a former Goodyear worker had the privilege of pressing the firing button.

References

Buildings and structures in Wolverhampton
Goodyear Tire and Rubber Company
Chimneys in the United Kingdom
Buildings and structures demolished in 2008